The 2006 IAAF World Athletics Tour was the first edition of the annual global circuit of one-day track and field competitions organized by the International Association of Athletics Federations (IAAF). The series featured 24 one-day meetings, consisting of the six meetings of the 2006 IAAF Golden League, six IAAF Super Grand Prix meetings, and twelve IAAF Grand Prix meetings. In addition, there were 25 Area Permit Meetings that carried point-scoring events. The series culminated in the two-day 2006 IAAF World Athletics Final, held in Stuttgart, Germany from 9–10 September.

The series replaced the IAAF World Outdoor Meetings series which had launched in 2003. As part of this change, the IAAF Grand Prix II category was dropped in favour of an Area Permit Meeting structure. In comparison to the preceding year's series, the Herculis meet returned to Super Grand Prix status, having hosted the IAAF World Athletics Final for three years. The British Grand Prix, Golden Spike Ostrava and Meeting de Atletismo Madrid all dropped down from Super to regular Grand Prix status. All previous Grand Prix II meetings were dropped from the main series, with the exception of the Melbourne Track Classic which was promoted to Grand Prix status. The Meeting Grand Prix IAAF de Dakar was included as a Grand Prix for the first time. Among other Grand Prix meets, the Meeting Lille-Métropole and Gugl Grand Prix were demoted to Area Permit Meeting and the Gran Premio Diputación was dropped from the circuit entirely.

Meetings

References

2006
World Athletics Tour